Transport Infrastructure Ireland is a state agency in Ireland dealing with road and public transport infrastructure. The body was established in 2015 by merging the former National Roads Authority and Railway Procurement Agency.

References

External links 
 Transport Infrastructure Ireland website

Transport organisations based in Ireland
Rail transport in the Republic of Ireland
Tram transport in the Republic of Ireland
Road transport in the Republic of Ireland
Road authorities
State-sponsored bodies of the Republic of Ireland
2015 establishments in Ireland